Rishabhanatha, also , Rishabhadeva,  or Ikshvaku is the first  (Supreme preacher) of Jainism and establisher of Ikshvaku dynasty. He was the first of twenty-four teachers in the present half-cycle of time in Jain cosmology, and called a "ford maker" because his teachings helped one cross the sea of interminable rebirths and deaths. The legends depict him as having lived millions of years ago. He was the spiritual successor of Sampratti Bhagwan, the last Tirthankar of previous time cycle. He is also known as Ādinātha  which translates into "First (Adi) Lord (nātha)",  as well as Adishvara (first Jina), Yugadideva (first deva of the yuga), Prathamarajeshwara (first God-king), Ikshvaku and Nabheya (son of Nabhi). Along with Mahavir Swami, Parshvanath, Neminath, and Shantinath, Rishabhanath is one of the five Tirthankaras that attract the most devotional worship among the Jains.

According to traditional accounts, he was born to king Nabhi and queen Marudevi in the north Indian city of Ayodhya, also called Vinita. He had two wives, Nanda and Sunanda. Nanda is described as the mother of his ninety-nine sons (including Bharata) and one daughter, Brahmi. Sunanda is depicted as the mother of Bahubali and Sundari. The sudden death of Nilanjana, one of the dancers sent by Indra in his courtroom, reminded him of the world's transitory nature, and he developed a desire for renunciation.

After his renunciation, the  legends state Rishabhanatha travelled without food for 6 months. The day on which he got his first  (food) is celebrated by Jains as Akshaya Tritiya. He attained Moksha on Mount Asthapada (Kailash). The text Adi Purana by Jinasena is an account of the events of his life and teachings. His iconography includes colossal statues such as Statue of Ahimsa, Bawangaja and those erected in Gopachal hill. His icons include the eponymous bull as his emblem, the Nyagrodha tree, Gomukha (bull-faced) Yaksha, and Chakreshvari Yakshi.

Life
Rishabhanatha is known by many names including Adinatha, Adishwara, Yugadeva and Nabheya. Ādi purāṇa, a major Jain text records the life accounts of Rishabhanatha as well as ten previous incarnations. Jain tradition depicts life of a tirthankara in five auspicious events called the pancha kalyanaka. These include garbha (mother's pregnancy), janma (birth), tapa (penance), keivalyagyana (omniscience) and moksha (liberation).

According to Jain cosmology, the universe does not have a temporal beginning or end. Its "Universal History" divides the cycle of time into two halves (avasarpiṇī and utsarpiṇī) with six aras (spokes) in each half, and the cycles keep repeating perpetually. Twenty-four Tirthankaras appear in every half, the first Tirthankara founding Jainism each time. In the present time cycle, Rishabhanatha is credited as being the first tīrthaṅkara, born at the end of the third half (known as sukhamā-dukhamā erā).

Rishabhanatha is said to be the founder of Jainism of the present Avsarpini (a time cycle) by the different Jain sub-traditions. Jain chronology places Rishabhanatha in historical terms, as someone who lived millions of years ago. He is believed to have been born 10224 years ago and lived for a span of 8,400,000 purva (592.704 × 1018 years). His height is described in the Jain texts to be 500 bows (1312 ells), or about 4920 feet/1500 meters. Such descriptions of non-human heights and age are also found for the next 21 Tirthankaras in Jain texts and according to Kristi Wiley – a scholar at University of California Berkeley known for her publications on Jainism. Most Indologists and scholars consider all the first 22 of 24 Tirthankaras to be prehistorical, or historical and a part of Jain mythology. However, among Jain writers and some Indian scholars, some of the first 22 Tirthankaras are considered to reflect historical figures, with a few conceding that the inflated biographical statistics are mythical.

According to Sarvepalli Radhakrishnan, a professor of comparative religions and philosophy at Oxford who later became the second President of India, there is evidence to show that Rishabhdeva was being worshipped by the first century BCE. The Yajurveda mentions the names of three Tirthankaras – Rishabha, Ajitanatha and Arishtanemi, states Radhakrishnan, and "the Bhāgavata Purāṇa endorses the view that Rishabha was the founder of Jainism".

Birth

Rishabhanatha was born to Nabhi and Marudevi, the king and queen of Ayodhya, on the ninth day of the dark half of the month of Chaitra-caitra krişna navamĩ. His association to Ayodhya makes it a sacred town for Jains, as it is in Hinduism for the birth of the Rama. In Jain tradition, the birth of a tirthankara is marked by 16 auspicious dreams of his mother. These are believed to have been seen by Marudevi on the second day of Ashadha (a month of the Jain calendar) Krishna (dark fortnight). The dreams signified tirthankara's birth according to the supposed explanation by the king to his queen.

Marriage and children
Rishabhanatha is believed to have two wives, Sunanda and Sumangala. Sumangala is claimed to be the mother of ninety-nine sons (including Bharata) and one daughter, Brahmi. Sunanda is suggested to be the mother of Bahubali and Sundari. Jain texts state that Rishabhanatha taught his daughters Brahmi and Sundari, Brahmi script and the science of numbers (Ank-Vidya) respectively. The Pannavana Sutra (2nd century BCE) and the Samavayanga Sutra (3rd century BCE) list many other writing scripts known to the ancient Jain tradition, of which the Brahmi script named after Rishabha's daughter tops the list. His eldest son, Bharata, is stated to have ruled ancient India from his capital of Ayodhya. He is described as a just and kind ruler in Jain texts, who was not attached to wealth or vices.

Rule, administration and teachings

Rishabhanatha was born in bhoga-bhumi or the age of omnipresent happiness. It is further suggested that no one had to work because of miraculous wish-fulfilling trees called the kalpavrikshas. It is stated that people approached the king for help due to decreased efficacy of the trees with passage of time. Rishabhanatha is then said to have taught them six main professions. These were: (1) Asi (swordsmanship for protection), (2) Masi (writing skills), (3) Krishi (agriculture), (4) Vidya (knowledge), (5) Vanijya (trade and commerce) and (6) Shilp (crafts). In other words, he is credited with introducing karma-bhumi (the age of action) by founding arts and professions to enable householders to sustain themselves. Rishabhanatha is credited in Jainism to have invented and taught fire, cooking and all the skills needed for human beings to live. In total, Rishabhanatha is said to have taught seventy-two sciences to men and sixty-four to women. The institution of marriage is stated to have come into existence after his marriage marked the precedence. According to Paul Dundas, Rishabhanatha, in Jainism, is thus not merely a spiritual teacher, but the one who founded knowledge in its various forms. He is depicted as a form of culture hero for the current cosmological cycle.

Traditional sources state that Rishabhanatha was the first king who established his capital at Vinitanagara (Ayodhya). He is claimed to have given first laws for governance by a king. He is said to have established the three-fold varna system based on professions consisting of kshatriyas (warriors), vaishyas (merchants) and shudras (manual workers). Bharata is said to have added fourth varna, brahmin to the system.

Renunciation

Jain legends talk about a dance of celestial dancers organised in Rishabhanatha's royal assembly hall by Indra, the heavenly-king of the first heaven. Nilanjana, one of the dancers, is said to have died in midst of the series of vigorous dance movements. The sudden death of Nilanjana is said to have reminded Rishabhanatha of the world's transitory nature, triggering him to renounce his kingdom, family and material wealth. He is then believed to have distributed his kingdom among his hundred sons. Bharata supposedly got the city of Ayodhya and Bahubali is believed to have got the city of Podanapur (Bodhan). He is believed to have become a monk in Siddharta-garden, in the outskirts of Ayodhya, under Ashoka tree on the ninth day of the month of Chaitra Krishna (Hindu calendar).

Akshaya Tritiya

Jains believe that people did not know the procedure to offer food to a monk, since Rishabhanatha was the first one. His great-grandson, Shreyansa, a king of Gajapura (now Hastinapur) after recalling the last birth, offered him sugarcane juice (ikshu-rasa) with required procedure to break 6-months-long fast. Jains celebrate the event as Akshaya tritiya every year on the third day of the bright fortnight of the month Vaishaka (usually April). It is believed to be the starting of the ritual of ahara-daana (food offerings) from layperson to mendicants.

Omniscience

Rishabhanatha is said to have spent a thousand years performing austerities before attaining kevala jnana (omniscience) under a banyan tree on the 11th day of falgun-krishna (a month in traditional calendar). The Devas (heavenly beings) are suggested to have created divine preaching halls known as samavasaranas for him after that. He is believed to have given the five major vows for monks and 12 minor vows for laity. He is believed to have established the sangha (four-fold religious order) consisting of male and female mendicants and disciples. His religious order is mentioned in Kalpa Sutra to have consisted of 84,000 sadhus (male monks) and 3,000,000 sadhvis (female monks).

Nirvana kalyanaka 

Rishabhanatha is said to have preached the principles of Jainism far and wide. He is suggested to have attained Nirvana or moksha, destroying all four of his ghati-karma. This is marked as liberation of his soul from the endless cycle of rebirths to stay eternally at siddhaloka. His death is believed in Jainism to have occurred on Ashtapada (also known as Mount Kailash) on the fourteenth day of Magha Krishna (Hindu Calendar). His total age at that time is suggested to be 84 lakh purva years, with three years and eight and a half months remaining of the third era. According to medieval era Jain texts, Rishabhanatha performed asceticism for millions of years, then returned to Ashtapada where he fasted and performing inner meditation to his moksha. They further state that Indra came with his fellow gods from the heavens after that, to perform rituals of the place from where tirthankara attend moksh.

In literature

The Ādi purāṇa, a 9th-century Sanskrit poem, and a 10th-century Kannada language commentary on it by the poet Adikavi Pampa (fl. 941 CE), written in Champu style, a mix of prose and verse and spread over sixteen cantos, deals with the ten lives of Rishabhanatha and his two sons. The life of Lord Rishabhanatha is also detailed in Mahapurana of Jinasena, Trisasti-salaka-purusa-caritra by the scholar Hemachandra, Kalpa Sutra a Jain text containing the biographies of the Jain Tirthankaras, and Jambudvipa-prajnapti. Bhaktamara Stotra by Acharya Manatunga is one of the most prominent prayers mentioning Rishabhanatha. There is mention of Rishabha in Hindu texts, such as in the Rigveda, Vishnu Purana and Bhagavata Purana (in 5th canto). In later texts, such as the Bhagavatapurana, he is described as an avatar of Vishnu, a great sage, known for his learning and austerities. Rishabhanatha is also mentioned in Buddhist literature. It speaks of several tirthankara and includes Rishabhanatha along with: Padmaprabha, Chandraprabha, Pushpadanta, Vimalanatha, Dharmanatha, and Neminatha. A Buddhist scripture named Dharmottarapradipa mentions Rishabhanatha as an Apta (Tirthankara).

Iconography

Rishabhanatha is usually depicted in the lotus position or kayotsarga, a standing posture of meditation. The distinguishing features of Rishabhanatha are his long locks of hair which fall on his shoulders, and an image of a bull in sculptures of him. Rishabhanatha's hairlocks have been depicted in first century A.D. sculptures found in Mathura and Causa. Paintings of him usually depict legendary events of his life. Some of these include his marriage, and Indra performing a ritual known as abhisheka (consecration). He is sometimes shown presenting a bowl to his followers and teaching them the art of pottery, painting a house, or weaving textiles. The visit of his mother Marudevi is also shown extensively in painting. He is also associated with his Bull emblem, the Nyagrodha tree, Gomukha (bull-faced) Yaksha, and Chakreshvari Yakshi.

It is said to be the world's tallest Jain idol. Officials from the Guinness Book of World Records visited Mangi Tungi and awarded the engineer of the 108 ft tall Rishabhdeva statue, C R Patil, the official certificate for the world's tallest Jain idol.

In Madhya Pradesh, there is the Bawangaja (meaning ) hill, near Barwani with a Gommateshvara figure covered on the top of it. This site is important to Jain pilgrims particularly on the full moon day in January. The site has a Rishabanatha statue carved from a volcanic rock. The  Rishabhanatha Statue at Gopachal Hill, Gwalior Fort, Madhya Pradesh. Thousands of Jain idols including 58.4 foot idol of Rishabhanatha were carved in the Gopachal Hill idol from 1398 A.D. to 1536 A.D. by rulers of Tomar dynasty rulers — Viramdev, Dungar Singh and Kirti Singh.

Temples

Rishabhanatha is one of the five most devotionally revered Tirthankaras, along with Mahavira, Parshvanatha, Neminatha and Shantinatha. Various Jain temple complexes across India feature him, and these are important pilgrimage sites in Jainism. Mount Shatrunjaya, for example, is a hilly part of southern Gujarat, which is believed to have been a place where 23 out of 24 Tirthankaras preached, along with Rishabha. Numerous monks are believed to have attained their liberation from cycles of rebirth there, and a large temple within the complex is dedicated to Rishabha commemorating his enlightenment in Ayodhya. The central Rishabha icon of this complex is called Adinatha or simply Dada (grandfather). This icon is the most revered of all the murtipujaka icons, believed by some in the Jain tradition to have miracle making powers, according to John Cort. In Jain texts, Kunti and the five Pandava brothers of the Hindu Epic Mahabharata came to the hill top to pay respects, and consecrated an icon of Rishabha at Shatrunjaya. Important Rishabha temple complexes include Palitana temples, Dilwara Temples, Kulpakji, Kundalpur, Paporaji, Soniji Ki Nasiyan, Rishabhdeo, Sanghiji, Hanumantal Bada Jain Mandir, Trilok Teerth Dham, Pavagadh and Sarvodaya Jain temple.

See also

 List of Jain Tirthankaras
 List of Tirthankaras
 God in Jainism
 History of Jainism
 Siddha

Notes

References

Citations

Sources

 
 
 
 
 
 
 
 
 
 
 
 
 
 
 
 
 
 
 
 
 
 
 
 
 
 
 
 
 
 
 
 
 
 
 
 
 
 

 
Tirthankaras
Solar dynasty
Ancient Indian people
Jain giants
Characters in the Bhagavata Purana
Forms of Vishnu
People from Uttar Pradesh
Mythological characters
Jainism